The Tuck Box is a historic Craftsman Storybook style commercial building in downtown Carmel-by-the-Sea, California. It was built in 1926, by master builder Hugh W. Comstock. The building was designated as a significant commercial building in the city's Downtown Historic District Property Survey, and was recorded with the Department of Parks and Recreation on October 8, 2002. The Tuck Box continues today as an English tea shop.

History

In 1926, Hugh W. Comstock designed and built what would be later called the Tuck Box, located on Dolores Street between Ocean & 7th Avenue. The Tuck Box is a one-and-one-half-story, steep-gabled shingled roofed, wood-framed Fairy tale Craftsman style commercial building in Carmel-by-the-Sea, California. The exterior walls are rough textured stucco with exposed faux-timber frame posts and beams. There is a main door entry in the front with a irregular multi-pane 8-pane French style wood door, and a three-sided bay window with overhang candy-stripe awning. It has a Clinker brick uneven chimney that Comstock used in his Hansel Doll House of 1924. Carmel stone is used below the front bay window and a gate, on the right, leads to a central courtyard.

Comstock erected the Art Shop for Bonnie Lee in 1926, for $1,200. She used it as an art shop that sold everything from antiques to opera glasses.

Pedro Joseph de Lemos (1882-1954), also known as Pedro J. Lemos, director of  Stanford Museum and Art Galleries, bought the building and adjacent property from Ray C. De Yoe in 1927. The space became known as the "Early Bird" and his vision was to fill it with unique shops and studios reminiscent of medieval shops in the "old world cities." In 1927, an addition was done for $500, by Lewis Anderson. 

At different times, the art shop was known as the "Mona Mona" building or Mona Mona Tea Room that served breakfast, lunch, afternoon tea, and dinner. In the early 1930s, the shop was known as "Sally's" tea room, and was also known as the "Lark." 

In April 1929, Lemos designed a fairy-tale cottage for himself, in the rear of the property, that Louis Anderson built for $1,000, called the Lemos Building, or Garden Shop. It sold flowers, plants, and garden tools. The shop later became known as the "Tuck Box Jam Shop." 

It is known as the Garden Shop Addition and is between the Tuck Box and the El Paseo Building.

In 1932, the shop was the Tyler Book Shop that sold new and old books, some of which were displayed in the three-sided bay window. To the right of the shop was the Blue Bird Tea Garden, and the Garden Shop Addition had a sign that said "The Garden Shop Flowers Plants Pottery."

In 1941, two sisters, Mrs. Watson and Mrs. Bumbridge, converted the front building into a tearoom and named it the "Tuck Box" after the trunks British schoolchildren used to carry their books and supplies. Today it is still a tea room that serves sandwiches, salads, hot tea in teapots, and scones with cream, orange marmalade, and other preserves.

In 1957, owners of the Tuck Box, purchased the Lemos building in back and renamed it the "Tuck Box Gift Shop." It was stocked with imports of linens, china, jewelry and pottery. The Tuck Box Gift Shop continued as a successful business until it was closed in November 1996.

Historic evaluation
The Tuck Box qualifies for inclusion in the Downtown Historic District Property Survey because it is a landmark "Fairy tale" Storybook style commercial building designed by Hugh Comstock in 1926, that is internationally associated with the city of Carme-by-the-Sea. The Mary Dummage Shop, modeled on the Tuck Box, was designed and built by Percy Parkes in 1926, and is located across the street on Dolores and 4th Street.

See also
 Pedro de Lemos House
 Timeline of Carmel-by-the-Sea, California

References

External links
 
 Downtown Conservation District Historic Property Survey
 Office of Historic Preservation

1926 establishments in California
Carmel-by-the-Sea, California
Buildings and structures in Monterey County, California